Val di Nizza is a comune (municipality) in the Province of Pavia in the Italian region Lombardy, located about 60 km south of Milan and about 35 km south of Pavia. As of 31 December 2004, it had a population of 701 and an area of 29.5 km².

Val di Nizza borders the following municipalities: Fortunago, Montesegale, Ponte Nizza, Ruino, Valverde, Varzi.

Demographic evolution

References

External links
 www.comune.valdinizza.pv.it/

Cities and towns in Lombardy